Robert Works Fuller (born 1936) is an American physicist, author, social reformer, and former president of Oberlin College.

Biography
Robert Fuller attended Oberlin College, leaving without graduating in order to earn his Ph.D. in physics at Princeton University in 1961. He taught at Columbia University, where he co-authored the book Mathematics of Classical and Quantum Physics.

Oberlin College president
The mounting social unrest of the 1960s, and Fuller's commitment to educational reform—which he had already demonstrated as a Trinity College dean—led his alma mater, Oberlin College, in 1970, to make him its tenth president, succeeding Robert K. Carr. At age 33 Fuller became one of the youngest college presidents in the country.

His Oberlin presidency was a turbulent time on campus and in higher education generally. Fuller established a faculty-administration body to consider basic structural change in the curriculum and calendar, as well as a Commission on the Status of Women, tripled the enrollment of minorities, and the college established an African Studies program. He took special interest in the arts, as well. He recruited Herbert Blau to head the Inter-Arts Program, which included the actor Bill Irwin and the director Julie Taymor. He encouraged The Oberlin Dance Collective, 

In what has been called the "Oberlin Experiment," he recruited and hired Jack Scott, writer about the sociology of sports, as Chairman of the Physical Education Dept. and Athletic Director.  Scott, in turn, recruited and hired the first four African-American athletic coaches at a predominantly white American college or university, including Tommie Smith, Gold Medalist sprinter from the 1968 Summer Olympics in Mexico City, and a woman for women's sports. Scott and Fuller were interviewed on campus by Howard Cosell and appeared on prime time television to talk about these changes they were seeking.

In 1974, after four years as Oberlin's president, Fuller resigned the office.

Ventures in social reform
In 1971 on a visit to India, Fuller had witnessed the famine caused by war with Pakistan; the war was a catalyst for the emergence of Bangladesh as an independent nation. 

With the election in the United States of President Jimmy Carter (D-Georgia), Fuller began a campaign to persuade the new leader to end world hunger. In 1977, Fuller co-founded The Hunger Project, along with Werner Erhard and singer John Denver. His June 1977 meeting with Carter in the Oval Office helped lead to the establishment of the Presidential Commission on World Hunger.

During the 1970s and 1980s, Fuller traveled frequently to the Soviet Union, working as a citizen-scientist to improve superpower relations during the Cold War. This led to the creation of the Mo Tzu Project, a group of citizen-diplomats traveling the world seeking citizen to citizen understanding to create sustainable peace.  It also resulted in the creation of the nonprofit global corporation Internews, which promotes democracy via free and independent media. For many years Fuller served as its chairman, working with Kim Spencer, David M. Hoffman and Evelyn Messinger (founders of Internews), Alia Johnson, Robert Cabot, and John Steiner, among others. In 1982, Fuller appeared in the PBS documentary Thinking Twice About Nuclear War.

With the collapse of the USSR, Fuller's turn as a citizen-diplomat came to a close. Reflecting on the different roles he had played, he came to understand that he had, at various times, enjoyed the status of a "somebody" while at other times he had embraced the position of a "nobody." His experiences in "Nobodyland" led him to identify rankism—a term he coined, and defined as the abuse of the power inherent in rank.

In 2003, Fuller published his seminal work, Somebodies and Nobodies: Overcoming the Abuse of Rank (New Society Publishers). The book inspired a group in Virginia to set up the Dignitarian Foundation. He published a sequel that focused on building a dignitarian society, titled All Rise: Somebodies, Nobodies, and the Politics of Dignity (Berrett-Koehler, 2006). In 2008, Fuller and co-author Pamela A. Gerloff released an 86-page "action-oriented guide" titled Dignity for All: How to Create a World Without Rankism.

An energetic evangelist for the Dignity Movement, Fuller frequently speaks at universities, conferences, and social policy organizations. Notable recent engagements include:
 National Conference on Dignity for All, Dhaka, Bangladesh 
 World Academy of Arts and Sciences 
 Institute for Social and Economic Change, Bangalore, India 
 Center for Therapeutic Justice, Williamsburg, Virginia
 National Association of Graduate-Professional Students (Keynote Speaker) 
 Haas Institute for a Fair and Inclusive Society, Berkeley, CA 
 Berkeley Carroll School (Visiting Writers Program) 
 Microsoft Corporation, Redmond, Washington 
 Royal Melbourne Institute of Technology, Australia
 Maison des Sciences de l’Homme, Paris 
 National Headquarters of the United Methodist Church, Washington, D.C.
 Harvard, Stanford, Yale, and Princeton universities

As of 2021, Fuller  maintains a blog at the Breaking Ranks website, and he also writes regular articles for The Huffington Post and Psychology Today. 

He explores the concepts of dignity and of dignitarian governance in his The Rowan Tree: A Novel (2013). Fuller is a Fellow of the World Academy of Arts and Sciences.

Personal life
Fuller lives in Berkeley, California with his wife, Claire Sheridan. He has four children and four grandchildren.

Works

Books
 Mathematics of Classical and Quantum Physics, co-authored with Frederick Byron, Jr. (a Dover Classic). Originally published by Addison-Wesley Publishing Company (1969).
 A Look at EST in Education, by Robert W. Fuller and Zara Wallace. Erhard Seminars Training (1975).
 Somebodies and Nobodies: Overcoming the Abuse of Rank. New Society Publishers (2003).
 All Rise: Somebodies, Nobodies, and the Politics of Dignity, sequel to Somebodies and Nobodies. Berrett-Koehler Publishers (2006).
 Dignity for All: How to Create a World Without Rankism, co-author Pamela Gerloff.  Berrett-Koehler Publishers (2008).
 Religion and Science: A Beautiful Friendship? (2012)
 Genomes, Menomes, Wenomes: Neuroscience and Human Dignity (2013)
 The Rowan Tree: A Novel (2013)
 Belonging A memoir. 
 The Wisdom of Science (2014)
 The Theory of Everybody (2014)
  Theo the White Squirrel (2016)
  Questions and Quests: A Short Book of Aphorisms (2016)

Physics articles
 Effect of a Composition Dependent Surface Tension upon the Masses and Stability of Heavy Nuclei, With R. Brandt, F. G. Werner, M. Wakano and J. A. Wheeler. Proc. of International Conference on Nuclidic Masses, Hamilton, (1960).
 Dependence on Neutron Production in Fission on Rate of Change of Nuclear Potential (Thesis with John A. Wheeler), Physical Review 126, 684 (1962).
 Causality and Multiply Connected Space-Time, with John A. Wheeler, 	Physical Review 128, 919 (1962).
 S-Matrix Solution for the Forced Harmonic Oscillator, with S. M. Harris and E. L. Slaggie. American Journal of Physics 31, 431 (1963).

Other articles
 On the Origin of Order in Behavior, General Systems, Vol. XI, pp. 99–112 (1966) MHRI, Univ. of Michigan (co-authored with Peter Putnam)
 Causal and Moral Law—Their Relationship as Examined in Terms of a Model of the Brain, Center for Advanced Studies, Wesleyan University, Monday Evening Papers: # 13 (1967) (On Peter Putnam's work.)
 On Educating Model-Builders, Publication of the 18th Symposium of the Conference on Science, Philosophy, and Religion, Jewish Theological Seminary, (1968)
 Project Rebound: A Science Course of Near-Drop-outs,  Science Education News (AAAS) Nov. 1969.
 Polar Bears, Walrus Hides, and Social Solidarity, The Alaska Journal, Vol. 3, No. 2; Spring, 1973 (with Sergei Bogojavlensky).
 Inflation: The Rising Cost of Living on a Small Planet, Worldwatch Paper, No. 34, Fall 1979.
 Inflation on a Small Planet, Economic Impact, 1980, No. 3.
 Inflation as a World Problem, Cry California, 1980, Summer
 Our Enemies, Our Selves, CoEvolution Quarterly, Spring 1980.
 A Better Game Than War, Evolutionary Blues, 1983. The Utne Reader Vol. 1, No. 1, Feb. 1984; Reprinted in The Peace Catalog, Press for Peace, Seattle, WA.; and in Citizen Summitry: Keeping the Peace when it Matters Too Much to be Left to Politicians, J. Tarcher, L.A., and St. Martin's, N.Y.C., 1986.
 Motzu in Kenya and Poland, CoEvolution Quarterly, Spring 1983.
 Motzuing: Notes on Discussions Regarding Nuclear Winter and Space Bridges with Chinese and Soviet Scientists, Whole Earth Review, May, 1985.
 We Are All Afrikaners, Annals of Earth, Vol. IV, #2, 1986. Reprinted in In Context, No. 14, Autumn 1986.
 AmerRuss, Whole Earth Review, Winter 1986; updated, as One World Scenario, Whole Earth Review, Fall 1990.
 Proposal for a World Peace Corps, included in the anthology Securing our Planet:  How to Succeed When Threats Are Too Risky and There's Really No Defense,  J. Tarcher, L.A., and St. Martin's, N.Y.C., 1986.
 The Asian Vortex, (with Robert Cabot), Harvard Magazine, November 1987. Reprinted in Resurgence, March–April 1988, Issue 127.
 Chasing Our Shadow, New Age Journal, Jan. 1988; Interview by David Hoffman.
 From Physics to Peace, included in the anthology At the Leading Edge, edited by Michael Toms, Larson Publications, Burdett, N.Y., 1991.
 Empire's End, Russia's Rebirth, (with Robert Cabot), Harvard Magazine, May–June, 1991, Volume 93, No. 5. (Also published in Annals of Earth, May, 1991.) Also, Should We Help Russia?, Harvard Magazine, (October, 1991).
 A description of citizen diplomacy, which includes a description of the "Mo Tzu Project", may be found in the book Multi-Track Diplomacy: A Systems Guide and Analysis, by Louise Diamond and John McDonald, Iowa Peace Institute (1991).
 The Future of Equality, The Deeper News, A Global Business Network Publication, Volume 4, Number 1, February 1993.
 Section in All of Us: Americans Talk About the Meaning of Death, Edited by Patricia Anderson, Delacorte Press, N. Y., N. Y. (1996), pp. 323–327.
 Something America and China Could Do Together, China Digital Times, May 6, 2013.
 A Moral Dilemma for Academia: Dignity for Adjuncts, The Huffington Post, February 6, 2014.
 Reasons You Can't Win (And 3 Reasons You Can Anyway), The Huffington Post, January 16, 2015.
 A New Default Self, The Huffington Post, January 28, 2015.

References

External links

 
 Official YouTube Channel
 Breaking Ranks – Information about Rankism
 The Rowan Tree: A Novel

1936 births
Living people
Princeton University alumni
Columbia University faculty
Oberlin College alumni
Human Potential Movement
Presidents of Oberlin College
21st-century American physicists
American social reformers